Caldicellulosiruptor saccharolyticus is a species of thermophilic, anaerobic cellulolytic bacterium. It was isolated from a piece of wood floating in the flow from a freshwater thermal spring in New Zealand in 1987, and tentatively named Caldocellum saccharolyticum. In 1994, the isolate was more thoroughly characterized physiologically, and classified to a new genus, Caldicellusiruptor, based on 16S RNA sequence. It is the type species, and more thoroughly studied member of its genus.

References

External links
Type strain of Caldicellulosiruptor saccharolyticus at BacDive -  the Bacterial Diversity Metadatabase

Thermoanaerobacterales
Bacteria described in 1994
Thermophiles
Anaerobes